Sepand Samzadeh (born 21 September 1975) is an American-Canadian-Iranian musician and producer. He is the co-founder, lead guitarist, and co-songwriter/co-producer of Days Between Stations.

Early life and education
Born in Tehran, Iran, Samzadeh moved to Marbella, Spain in 1981 at the age of six. He attended a private American Catholic school, simultaneously adding the Spanish and English language to his native Persian. In 1986, Samzadeh and his family moved to Toronto, Canada.

In the late 1970s through the 1990s Samzadeh, through his father, was exposed to Persian traditional music.  He finished his first grade in Tehran and due to the Iranian Revolution and turmoil, Samzadeh's parents opted to immigrate to Spain so he and his sister could have a better life.  Growing up in Marbella in the mid 1980s, Sepand was exposed to The Beatles and synth-pop.  On 8 May 1986 when Queen came to his small town in Marbella, being asked to go to his room by his parents to sleep, young Samzadeh instead decided to open his window while sitting on his bed and was changed by the music.  Moving to Canada in 1986, Samzadeh was exposed to hard rock, heavy metal, rockabilly, classical music and acid house music.  In September 1990, Samzadeh was again changed when he heard his favorite band, Nirvana.  By the late 1990s Samzadeh added house music and trance music to his influences.
 
Samzadeh's family moved to Los Angeles, California in 1994, while he accepted and attended University of Toronto's mechanical engineering program, he graduated in 1999.  Samzadeh decided to remain in Hamilton, Canada to gain work experience and remained there until 2001, moving to Los Angeles to earn an MBA degree from Pepperdine University and to start a recycling company.

Career
In fall 2003, Samzadeh placed an ad in a local magazine and Oscar Fuentes responded. The two began composing music and Fuentes suggested a name for the band, Days Between Stations – the name of a novel Fuentes had read by Steve Erikson. In 2004, Fuentes and Samzadeh sent Bruce Soord, leader of the British band The Pineapple Thief, a CD of mostly improvised material. Soord used some of this material as the basis for the song "Saturday" on The Pineapple Thief's 12 Stories Down (Cyclops 2004).

To help flesh out their sound in the studio, the band contacted former Young Dubliners drummer Jon Mattox in 2005. Mattox joined as drummer and co-producer. The band further enlisted guitarist Jeremy Castillo, Argentinian-born bassist Vivi Rama, sax player Jason Hemmens, singer Hollie Shepard, trumpeter Sean Erick and trombonist Kevin Williams. Their eponymous debut CD was released in October 2007 on Bright Orange Records.

In 2008, Fuentes and Samzadeh began working on their second album. In 2012, Fuentes and Samzadeh, looking for a vocalist, were introduced to Billy Sherwood, who co-produced the album, co-wrote the lyrics and mixed in Extremis.  Sherwood also helped arrange the song "The Man Who Died Two Times". Peter Banks was the first to be brought into the project.  Banks had praised the band on their debut album and became and instrumental force on two songs, Eggshell Man and in Extremis. Tony Levin played bass on the entire CD. Rick Wakeman and Colin Moulding delivered their contributions to Eggshell Man and the Man Who Died Two Times, respectively.

In Extremis, the Days Between Stations second album, was released 15 May 2013.  The album ranked on many of 2013's top 10 Progressive rock albums, landing No.1 in Germany and Holland.

The third Days Between Stations album, named Giants, is to be released in early 2020.  Giants will feature Samzadeh, Oscar Fuentes Bills, Colin Moulding, Durga McBroom and Billy Sherwood.

Samzadeh and Billy Sherwood formed a side project with Jennifer Jo Oberle, titled The Settlements, also set for release in 2020.

Samzadeh is also scoring for a documentary based on the work of artist and photographer Jean Paul Bourdier.

Personal life
Samzadeh resides in Los Angeles, California and maintains a studio in San Fernando Valley.  Samzadeh divorced in October 2018, with two children, Tiam Samzadeh and Idin Samzadeh.  Samzadeh is passionate about the environment and has a recycling plant in Los Angeles that drives companies to zero waste.  In 2012 the mayor of Los Angeles appointed him a city commissioner.

Discography

Compact disks

References

External links

Days Between Stations Homepage
Days Between Stations at last.fm

1975 births
Living people
Songwriters from California
Progressive rock guitarists
Progressive metal guitarists
Guitarists from Los Angeles
21st-century American keyboardists
21st-century American guitarists